Kriegsmarinewerft (or, prior to 1935, Reichsmarinewerft) Wilhelmshaven was, between 1918 and 1945, a naval shipyard in the German Navys extensive base at Wilhelmshaven, ( west of Hamburg).

History
The shipyard was founded on the site of the Wilhelmshaven Imperial Shipyard which had been closed down after World War I.

In 1935, the name was changed to Kriegsmarinewerft Wilhelmshaven (Wilhelmshaven Naval Shipyard) when the German navy (Reichsmarine) was renamed Kriegsmarine by the Nazi Third Reich.

During 1939-1945, the yard's main activities were in building U-boats and repairing damaged warships. On 18 December 1939, 12 out of 22 RAF's Wellington bombers were shot down in an air battle over the naval base. Personnel were often assigned to organizing naval facilities in occupied countries, e.g., in the ports of Lorient, Brest and St. Nazaire. At the war's end there were about 17,000 workers.

Polish and British troops reached Wilhelmshaven in May 1945. For a time, the yard refurbished ships to be sent to the Allies as war reparations but, from 1946, most buildings and equipment were either dismantled or blown up.

Since 1957, part of the site has housed an arsenal for the German Navy (Deutsche Bundesmarine).

Selection of ships built
1920-1922: 28 fishing vessels
1922: four cargo ships
1925: Light cruiser 
1926-1928: six torpedo-boats
1929: K-class light cruiser 
1930: K-class light cruiser 
1931: Gunnery training ship 
1934:  Panzerschiff (armoured ship, later classified as heavy cruiser) 
1936: Deutschland-class Panzerschiff  
1939:  
1941:  
1941-1944: 27 Type VII submarines

References

G. Koop, K. Galle, F. Klein, Von der Kaiserlichen Werft zum Marinearsenal'', Bernard & Graefe Verlag München, 1982, 

Shipbuilding companies of Germany
Manufacturing companies established in 1918
Defunct companies of Germany
Companies of Prussia
Wilhelmshaven
1918 establishments in Germany
1945 disestablishments in Germany
Manufacturing companies disestablished in 1945